Jorge García Usta (January 13, 1960 – December 25, 2005) was a Colombian novelist, poet, essayist and journalist.

Biography 
García was born in the San Jerónimo hospital of Montería as grandson of Syro-Lebanese immigrants, and was son of the physician José Antonio García Schotborgh and his wife Nevija Usta Zaruf, who lived in Ciénaga de Oro. When he was three years old, his father died in Puebla, Mexico, his mother died in 1988. In 1979 he matriculated at Universidad de Cartagena, where he lectured later, to study law, but soon changed to Saint Thomas Aquinas University, where he did his studies of philosophy and literature. In 1989 he married Rocío García.

García worked for several Colombian journals and was president of the Circle of Journalists in Cartagena ( and of the Cultural Foundation Héctor Rojas Herazo. In 1984 he was awarded with the national León de Greiff poetry award. Due to a cerebral disease he died in the hospital of Bocagrande.

Selected works 
 Noticias desde la otra orilla, poetry, 1985
 El libro de las crónicas, poetry, 1989
 El reino errante: poemas de la migración y el mundo árabes, poetry, 1991
 Monteadentro, poetry, 1992
 La tribu interior, poetry, 1995
 Noticias de un animal antiguo, poetry, 2001

References

External links 
 

Colombian male writers
1960 births
2005 deaths
People from Montería